The 22535 / 22536 Rameswaram–Manduadih Express is an Express train belonging to Indian Railways – North Eastern Railway zone that runs between  and  in India.

It operates as train number 22535 from Rameswaram to Banaras and as train number 22536 in the reverse direction, serving the states of Tamil Nadu, Andhra Pradesh, Telangana, Maharashtra, Madhya Pradesh & Uttar Pradesh.

Coaches

The 22536 / 22536 Rameswaram–Banaras Express has one AC 2 tier, Six AC 3 tier, eight Sleeper Class, six General Unreserved & 2 EOG coaches. It doesn't carry a pantry car. Now it had been provided with LHB coaches (Link Hofmann coaches) from 09/09/2018.

As is customary with most train services in India, coach composition may be amended at the discretion of Indian Railways depending on demand.

Service

Schedule

Routing

The 122535 / 22536 Rameswaram–Banaras Express runs from Rameswaram via ,, 
,
Devakottai Road,
,
, 
,
, 
,
, 
, 
,
,
,
, 
,
,  to Banaras.

Traction

References

External links
15119 Rameswaram Manduadih Express at India Rail Info
15120 Manduadih Rameswaram Express at India Rail Info

Express trains in India
Rail transport in Tamil Nadu
Rail transport in Andhra Pradesh
Rail transport in Telangana
Rail transport in Maharashtra
Rail transport in Madhya Pradesh
Transport in Rameswaram
Passenger trains originating from Varanasi